St. Martin Secondary School is a separate Roman Catholic secondary school located in the Erindale neighbourhood of Mississauga, Ontario, Canada. It is under the jurisdiction of the Dufferin-Peel Catholic District School Board.  The current principal of St. Martin Secondary School is Jason Pratt. The school has approximately 1088 students (2019).

The school offers a Specialist High Skills Major (SHSM) in Sports, and Hospitality and Tourism.

Elementary Feeder Schools 

 Mary Fix Catholic School
 St. Catherine of Siena Separate School
 St. Gerard Elementary School
 St. Jerome Separate School
 St. John XXIII Catholic School
 Philip Pocock Catholic Secondary School (For Extended French)

History 

St. Martin Secondary School was founded in 1968 as St. Martin Senior School. Grade 7 students were taught at St. Francis School in the gym and Grade 8 students were taught at St. Catherine School in the gym until the new St. Martin Senior School was ready for occupancy sometime in October . The first graduating class attended St. Martin School for seven years, from grade 7 to 13.

Since 1968, St. Martin Secondary School has stood on Rosemary Drive. Every year, students were told that St. Martin's were on the top of the list for renovation. In 2000, the time came and plans for the new building were drawn up. In the school year 2000–2001, students studied at the SMSS Streetsville Campus waiting for the building to be reconstructed. In September 2001, the new St. Martin's building was finished.

St. Martin Secondary School is the oldest high school in the Dufferin-Peel Catholic District School Board; it celebrated its 50th anniversary during the school year of 2018–2019.

Uniform 
From 2008 to 2013, St. Martin's uniform consisted of navy blue long and short sleeve rugby sweaters, navy blue short sleeve golf shirts, and khaki pants.

The current school uniform consists of white short and long sleeve golf shirts, navy blue short sleeve golf shirts, navy blue shorts, and navy blue pants. In addition, a navy blue zip-up sweater may be worn on top of the uniform shirts. The School Uniform is provided by McCarthy Uniforms Inc. And has been since they implemented a uniform from a dress code in 1975

Notable alumni 

 Jordan Balazovic
 Naz Mitrou-Long
 Gavin McCallum
 Philip Tomasino

External links 
 
Dufferin-Peel website

High schools in Mississauga
Catholic secondary schools in Ontario
Educational institutions established in 1968
1968 establishments in Ontario